The School House in Beaver, Utah, at 325 N. 200 West, was built probably in the 1870s by Scottish-born local stonemason Thomas Frazer.  It was listed on the National Register of Historic Places in 1983.

It has also been known as the District #3 School House.  It is a one-and-a-half-story building, made of black rock, which displays three of Frazer's stylistic characteristics:  it uses ashlar stonework on the front facade, it has square-pointed mortar joints that were dyed white, and it has a Greek Revival-style cornice.

The building was converted to a house in the 1890s, with a frame extension to the rear then being added.  Also a cinderblock shed was added, projecting to the rear, in the 1950s.

References

Schools in Utah
National Register of Historic Places in Beaver County, Utah
School buildings completed in 1875